Mafia: Definitive Edition is a 2020 action-adventure game developed by Hangar 13 and published by 2K. It is a remake of the 2002 video game Mafia. Like the original game, the remake is set within the fictional city of Lost Heaven, Illinois, during the 1930s, and follows the rise and fall of Tommy Angelo, a Sicilian American cab driver-turned-gangster, within the Salieri crime family.               

The game's open world nature allows players to explore Lost Heaven at their leisure when not completing missions to advance the narrative. This is mostly done in the Free Ride game mode, where players are not restricted by the linear nature of missions and can find hidden side missions and collectibles exclusive to this mode. The gameplay builds upon 2016's Mafia III, and features enhanced mission dynamics and the introduction of motorcycles to the series. While some of the veteran Czech Mafia voice cast returned for the remake, the English voices were recast. An original score was also created for the game.               

The game was released for PlayStation 4, Windows, and Xbox One on September 25, 2020, both individually and as part of the Mafia: Trilogy pack, which also includes a remastered version of the second game and a lightly altered port of the third game which includes its additional story packs. It received generally favorable reviews from critics, with praise for revitalizing the story, performances, and graphics, yet faced some criticism over its animations.

Gameplay
Conceived as a full remake of the original, Mafia: Definitive Edition was built from the ground up with new assets and an expanded story, although missions and arcs from the original game are carried over. As with the 2002 game, players control Tommy Angelo throughout the game's single-player campaign, and its world is navigated on foot or by vehicle. New to the remake is the introduction of motorcycles, a first in the series. Mafia: Definitive Edition's gameplay mechanics are based on those of Mafia III. A 'Classic Difficulty' setting is also included, serving as the game's hardest difficulty setting that changes some gameplay mechanics such as ammunition management and police response to crimes, bringing the game closer to the original 2002 game.

Outside the main story mode, a separate Free Ride mode is included "as a nod to the original game", allowing the player to explore the city at their own leisure without any mandatory mission objectives. Unlike the original game, however, Free Ride and Free Ride Extreme are merged into one game mode, with the latter's outlandish and over-the-top side missions incorporated into the main Free Ride segment as hidden secrets to be uncovered by the player.

A post-release update released in October 2020 added new activities in the game's Free Ride mode, including taxi missions and a racing mode which takes place in the autodrome featured in the mission "Fair Play". Also included in the update is the ability to play the game in black and white, labeled in the game's settings menu as "Noir Mode" as a homage to film noir movies of the era, as well as various options allowing the player to show or hide parts of the game's HUD.

Plot

In 1930, impoverished taxi driver Thomas "Tommy" Angelo is strong-armed by two members of the Salieri crime family—Paulie Lombardo and Sam Trapani—into helping them escape an ambush by the rival Morello family. Tommy is compensated for his help and offered a position in Don Ennio Salieri's organization, which he initially refuses, but is forced to accept after being attacked by two Morello gangsters in an act of revenge. Tommy begins to assist with running Salieri's rackets across Lost Heaven, overseen by his consigliere Frank Colletti, and befriends Paulie and Sam while earning Salieri's respect for thwarting Don Marcu Morello's attempts to take over his businesses.

In 1932, Tommy, now a made man in the Salieri family, begins a relationship with Sarah Marino, the daughter of Salieri's bartender Luigi, after protecting her from a street gang. On Salieri's orders, Tommy and Paulie retaliate against the gang, but learn that their leader, whom Paulie killed, was the son of corrupt city councillor Roberto Ghillotti, who vows revenge. Later, Tommy is ordered to destroy a brothel for switching its loyalties to Morello, and kill an informant named Michelle who is working there, but ends up sparing her at Sam's request and covering up his actions. 

In 1933, Morello ramps up his efforts to dismantle Salieri's organization, gaining support from the corrupt police force and Ghillotti. Following an ambush on a bootlegging operation, Salieri finds that Frank has disappeared with the family's account books, and reluctantly orders Tommy to kill him. Discovering Frank has become desillusioned with the criminal lifestyle and made a deal with the FBI after Morello threatened his family, Tommy allows him to flee the country with his family in exchange for the books, and covers up his actions once again.

In 1935, the Salieri and Morello families begin moving out into new rackets following the end of prohibition, while Tommy, promoted to caporegime for his successes, marries Sarah and starts a family with her. Learning that Salieri is making moves to gain control over law enforcement, Morello attempts to have him killed. After Tommy saves him, Salieri declares open war on his rival. Tommy helps to weaken Morello's position by assassinating Ghillotti, to reduce Morello's control over city politics, and Morello's brother Sergio, to reduce his control on the port unions. The war eventually comes to an end after Tommy, Paulie, and Sam kill Morello himself as he attempts to flee Lost Heaven. 

By 1938, the Salieri family is in full control of Lost Heaven's rackets and ruthlessly eliminating anyone who opposes them. When Tommy, Paulie, and Sam agree to recover a stash of diamonds hidden amongst a shipment of impounded cigars, they are shocked to discover heroin instead. Enraged at Salieri lying to them about the cargo's true nature and becoming involved in the drug trade despite telling them to never do so, Tommy and Paulie decide to carry out a bank heist that will allow them to retire, without cutting Salieri in. Although the job is a success, Tommy finds Paulie dead in his apartment the following day and the stolen money missing. When he meets with Sam to discuss the matter, he learns that Salieri ordered him to kill Tommy and Paulie for going behind his back, and that Frank and Michelle were murdered by Salieri's men after Tommy's past cover-ups were exposed. Tommy survives Sam's ambush and mortally wounds him, delivering a killing shot when Sam tries to cut Tommy a deal to help him fake his death in exchange for sparing him. 

With his former allies now against him, Tommy goes into hiding with his family, but fearing for their safety, he eventually contacts a detective, John Norman. After relaying his story to him, Tommy offers to testify against the Salieri family in exchange for a reduced prison sentence and protection for his family. Norman agrees, being a family man himself, and the resulting investigation and mob trials lead to most of the Salieri family, including Don Salieri, being convicted and sentenced. After serving eight years in prison, Tommy is reunited with his family as they are all placed under witness protection and relocated to Empire Bay. Tommy lives a peaceful life with his family until 1951, when two hitmen approach him. Accepting his fate and knowing that his criminal past has caught up to him, Tommy is shot and left to die on his front lawn. He succumbs to his wounds surrounded by his family, content that they are safe now. The game ends with a speech Tommy made at his daughter's wedding about the importance of family; concluding that while everything else comes and goes, family is forever.

Development 

On May 13, 2020, a remake of Mafia was announced by 2K Games titled Mafia: Definitive Edition, as a part of the Mafia: Trilogy — the other parts being a remaster of Mafia II and a version of Mafia III bundled with its expansion story packs. Development was placed in the hands of Hangar 13, who opted to expand on the original story and gameplay, and create a brand new, original score. To ensure the game would be suitable for the latest generation of consoles and systems Hangar 13 rebuilt the game with an updated game engine taken from Mafia III.

As part of the rebuild, the entire setting of the original game was redesigned. The development team focused on restyling the city to match those of the United States around the 1920s and 1930s following World War I, improving on the atmosphere and aesthetic designs of the city's various districts. One example of this was redesigning the original setting's district of Chinatown to feature more recognizable buildings and decorations. Other improvements focused on modifying the street layouts to coincide with the smoother driving mechanics implemented into the game, including smoother corners and intersections, as well as relocating several buildings and landmarks to new sites and adding in shortcuts and alleys, in order to help with the remaking of the original game's missions - Hangar 13 specifically altered how players traversed between objectives by using specialized data-mapping to view the driving patterns of players in the original game, assessing how to best change this for the remake.

The English language soundtrack for the game was recorded with a different cast, with Italian Australian actor Andrew Bongiorno lending his voice, likeness and motion capture performance to Tommy Angelo. Hangar 13 president Haden Blackman stated "since our cinematics rely heavily on motion capture data, it was essential that we have both voice and physical performances," and they wanted to ensure that the actors not only "looked the part" but could also perform well on both motion capture and voice-over booths. Conversely, the Czech dub has most of the surviving cast from the 2002 game reprise their roles for the remake, namely Marek Vašut who returned to voice Tommy.

Efforts to prepare the game for release on August 28, 2020, were hampered by the COVID-19 pandemic, which presented several challenges with completion of the game. One problem was completing the main theme of the remake, which was solved by conducting several sessions with their orchestra - each session having a selected group of members to perform their pieces while complying with social distancing protocols - and then mixing all recordings post-production. Overcoming the problems meant that the game's launch date was pushed back towards the end of September.

The game includes collectibles hidden throughout its world in the form of period-accurate magazines and comics, such as Black Mask, Super Science Stories, Dime Detective Magazine, and Terror Tales, along with fictional collectibles based on the Mafia mythos, such as the Gangsters Monthly comic series based on events that take place throughout the game and cigarette cards featuring likenesses of Mafia series characters and their backstories.

Reception 

Mafia: Definitive Edition received "generally favorable reviews" from critics, according to review aggregator Metacritic.

IGN gave the game 8/10, writing: "Completely rebuilt from the ground up, Mafia: Definitive Edition features excellent performances from its new cast, a fantastic driving model, and a beautiful and authentic city oozing with 1930s atmosphere like overfilled cannoli."

GameSpot gave the game a 6/10, praising the story and performances but criticizing the dated combat and movements. Game Informer gave the game a 5.5/10, writing: "Faithful almost to a fault, Hangar 13's remake puts a glossy finish on a title that is fundamentally musty by contemporary standards."

The original developer and writer of the first game, Dan Vávra, praised the remake's graphics, though criticised some changes to the script, as well as certain physics elements involving weapons and vehicles. Vavra departed 2K Games in 2009, and had no involvement or knowledge about the game's production.

Sales 
In its first week of release the game was the third-best-selling in the UK, with the Mafia Trilogy finishing sixth.

Notes

References

External links 
 
 

2020 video games
Action-adventure games
Works about the American Mafia
Mafia (series)
Open-world video games
Organized crime video games
PlayStation 4 games
PlayStation 4 Pro enhanced games
Take-Two Interactive games
Vehicular combat games
Video games set in the 1930s
Video games developed in the Czech Republic
Video games developed in the United Kingdom
Video games developed in the United States
Video games set in Illinois
Video games postponed due to the COVID-19 pandemic
Windows games
Works set during the Great Depression
Xbox One games
Xbox One X enhanced games
Video game remakes
Video games about taxis
Video games using Havok
Works about witness protection
2K games